The anti-collision device (ACD) is a form of automatic train protection used on Indian Railways.

Overview 
The ACD Network is a train-collision prevention system invented by Rajaram Bojji and patented by Konkan Railway Corporation, a public-sector undertaking of the Ministry of Railways, government of India.

Anti-collision devices were found to be effective in the Southern Railway zone after a brief trial.

Level crossings 
When Loco ACDs receive 'Gate Open' transmissions from Gate ACDs provided at non-interlocked level crossings, they brake to decelerate to 30 km/h or an alternative predetermined speed. Gate ACDs at manned and unmanned level crossings also warn passengers with the message 'Train Approach'.

If a Loco ACD receives a manual 'SOS' message from other train bound ACDs or a station ACD that is within three kilometres of its radial range, it applies brakes automatically to bring the train to a stop.

The application of this anti-collision device has been refined to not only prevent midsection collisions but also to prevent their occurrences in station yards. The newly engineered solution is integrated with the signalling systems, interlocking to react appropriately in case collision-like conditions are perceived at the time of reception and dispatch of trains from a station (e.g. while approaching a station). Loco ACDs also give 'Station Approach' alerts to train operators and regulate train speed when they receives information from Station ACDs.

Loco shed ACDs, Track-ID Assigning ACDs and Repeater ACDs strengthen the ACD network.

Future 
Indian Railways have successfully piloted ACDs in the northeast frontier railway, covering  of its broad gauge route.

The on-board train protection device, the first device designed by Konkan Railway with their technical partner Kernex Microsystems (I) Ltd, was installed throughout the Indian Railway network.

A new ACD Version-II, now called the Train Collision Avoidance System (TCAS), is under development by The Research Designs and Standards Organisation (RDSO). Unlike ACD, which is more of a distributed system which acts independently, the TCAS will be more of a centralized system where TCAS controls communication between trains and with trains with the TDMA protocol. The TCAS under development is meant to be a vital safety system. TCAS has a deep coupling with the railway signalling system so ACD systems do not depend on the railway signalling system.

ACD deficiencies 
The ACD system is based on GPS based positioning and track detection. This has inherent problems as with GPS service and course acquisition, the best possible horizontal accuracy is 10 m. ACD does not even have DGPS, differential GPS that gives an accuracy close to 2.5 m, and hence had errors in track detection using their patented Deviation Count Theory that worked in block sections but failed in station sections. The result was erratic braking that disrupted train movements and proved to be ineffective.

The Railway Collision Avoidance System was patented in 2001 by an Indian inventor, Indranil Majumdar from Calcutta. He was awarded the Texas Instruments Analog Design Challenge 2001 for this design and another patent was granted in 2007. The design ruled out GPS as it was a 3rd party US based system. Instead it uses track based sensors similar to RFID or Balise similar to the EuroBalise. The design did not receive much attention as Majumdar had no railway background. However, the design concepts were eventually reflected in the TCAS design first released in 2008.

After seven or eight years of problems with the ACD system, RDSO, Lucknow drafted the Train Collision Avoidance System (TCAS) specifications with amendments. In 2012, the Ver3.1.1 specification was released after joint consultation with companies manufacturing signaling equipment for the Indian Railways. The ACD system used in Indian Railways has inherent problems in station sections due to their design, using GPS for unfeasible track detection.

The High-Level Safety Review Committee at Mumbai on 12–13 January 2012 at the Western Railway HQ was skeptical of ACD effectiveness. They unanimously chose to develop TCAS as an open architecture system without charging royalties unlike the ACD which is proprietary.

TCAS is being developed in India by qualified companies, manufacturing railway safety systems selected by RDSO through an Expression of Interest (EOI). These companies includes Medha Servo Drives Hyderabad, Kernex Microsystems, Hyderabad Batteries Ltd and others. Indian Train Protection Systems will offer collision avoidance and also many functionalities of the European Train Control System, including prevention of Signal Passing at Danger (SPAD), Movement Authority and Control, Critical Train Data Recorder, advance in cab display of signals, advance alerts and warnings from station sections, uploading of running train data to a Central Train Management System over GSM-GPRS or other cellular networks.

The Indian government selected TCAS for future installation at a cost of 10 L INR per kilometre.

See also
 Train Warning System

References 

Train protection systems